The South River is a tributary of the Black River, approximately  long, in southeastern North Carolina in the United States.

It rises 2 miles Northeast of Falcon, North Carolina on the Cumberland and Sampson County line at the confluence of Mingo Swamp and the smaller Black River.  The smaller Black River flows 30 miles from northeastern Harnett County, in Angier and approximately 25 mi (40 km) south of Raleigh. The smaller Black River flows SSE past Benson, then SSW passing west of Dunn. East of Fayetteville, the South River turns SSE and joins the larger Black River near Ivanhoe, North Carolina approximately 30 mi (48 km) northwest of Wilmington.

Fishing 
The South River is home to a wide variety of fish species, including Largemouth Bass, chain pickerel, various species of sunfish, longnose gar, and catfish. To navigate through the river, a kayak or a small jon boat is recommended.

See also 
 List of North Carolina rivers

References

Rivers of North Carolina
Rivers of Harnett County, North Carolina
Rivers of Johnston County, North Carolina
Rivers of Cumberland County, North Carolina